Maria Sowina (born 1900, death date unknown) was a Polish politician from the People's Party. During World War II, she was a activist of the people's movement. She became a government activist after the war.

In 1928, she became a member of the Youths Rural Organisation. She joined the People's Party in 1931, and was the first woman elected to the central committee and parliament of the party.

References 

1900 births
Year of death unknown
People's Party (Poland) politicians
20th-century Polish politicians
People of the Second Polish Republic
20th-century Polish women politicians